The Historic Pact for Colombia (PHxC) is a political and electoral coalition in Colombia composed of political parties and social movements with ideologies ranging from the centre-left, left-wing, and far-left. It is the current Government Coalition in Colombia after the 2022 presidential elections. 

This was launched on 11 February 2021 through a press conference where political leaders of the country participated, including Gustavo Petro, Alexander López, Iván Cepeda, María José Pizarro, Roy Barreras, Clara López, Aída Avella, Armando Benedetti, Jorge Rojas Rodríguez, Iván Guarín, and Martha Peralta. In September 2021 Agmeth Escaf, Luis Fernando Velasco, and Piedad Córdoba were added to the coalition. The coalition's presidential nominee, Gustavo Petro, advanced to the second round and defeated Rodolfo Hernández Suárez.

Mission
Obtain a majority in the Congress of the Republic by winning a total of 55 seats in the Senate and 86 seats in the Chamber of Representatives in the 2022 Colombian parliamentary election on 13 March.
Present the country with an alternative power proposal that will be built by the social bases that accompany the Historic Pact.
Win the presidency in the 2022 presidential election, with the first and second rounds being held on 29 May and 19 June respectively.

Member parties and presidential candidates

Electoral history

Presidential elections

References

2021 establishments in Colombia
Left-wing political party alliances
Political parties established in 2021
Political party alliances in Colombia